Holy Trinity Church is in Runcorn, Cheshire, England.  It is an active Anglican parish church in the diocese of Chester, the archdeaconry of Chester and the deanery of Frodsham.  Its benefice is combined with that of All Saints, Runcorn.  It is recorded in the National Heritage List for England as a designated Grade II listed building.

History
The church was built in 1838 as an evangelical alternative to the parish church of Runcorn.  The cost was met by public subscription, with John and Thomas Johnson, soap and alkali manufacturers, being the principal subscribers.  It was designed by Joseph Hartley, a local architect, and the church was built by William Rigby, a local builder.  The original chancel was short and a longer chancel was added in 1857.

Architecture

Exterior
The church is built in red sandstone with a slate roof.  Its plan consists of a west tower which is partly embraced, a five-bay nave and a chancel.  The main entrance is through a door on the west face of the tower.  Above this is a three-lancet window and paired louvred bell-openings. The summit has pyramid pinnacles and a crenellated parapet.

Interior
The reredos is made from marble. The altar and pulpit are oak, the latter being on a stone base. The choir stalls are carved with poppyheads.  At the west end of the church is a wooden gallery on round cast iron columns. The stained glass in the east window probably dates from the 1860s, and is probably by William Wailes.  The three-manual organ dates from 1908 and its building was assisted by a grant from Andrew Carnegie.

See also

Listed buildings in Runcorn (urban area)

References

Church of England church buildings in Cheshire
Grade II listed churches in Cheshire
Gothic Revival church buildings in England
Gothic Revival architecture in Cheshire
Holy Trinity
Diocese of Chester
19th-century Church of England church buildings
Churches completed in 1857
1838 establishments in England